Mount Craig may refer to:

Mount Craig (Colorado) in Colorado, USA
Mount Craig (North Carolina) in North Carolina, USA
Mount Craig (Yukon) in Yukon, Canada